The 1953 Chicago Cubs season was the 82nd season of the Chicago Cubs franchise, the 78th in the National League and the 38th at Wrigley Field. The Cubs finished seventh in the National League with a record of 65–89.

Regular season

Season standings

Record vs. opponents

Notable transactions 
 June 4, 1953: Toby Atwell, Bob Schultz, Preston Ward, George Freese, Bob Addis, Gene Hermanski, and $150,000 were traded by the Cubs to the Pittsburgh Pirates for Ralph Kiner, Joe Garagiola, Catfish Metkovich, and Howie Pollet.
 September 8, 1953: Ernie Banks was signed as an amateur free agent by the Cubs.

Roster

Player stats

Batting

Starters by position 
Note: Pos = Position; G = Games played; AB = At bats; H = Hits; Avg. = Batting average; HR = Home runs; RBI = Runs batted in

Other batters 
Note: G = Games played; AB = At bats; H = Hits; Avg. = Batting average; HR = Home runs; RBI = Runs batted in

Pitching

Starting pitchers 
Note: G = Games pitched; IP = Innings pitched; W = Wins; L = Losses; ERA = Earned run average; SO = Strikeouts

Other pitchers 
Note: G = Games pitched; IP = Innings pitched; W = Wins; L = Losses; ERA = Earned run average; SO = Strikeouts

Relief pitchers 
Note: G = Games pitched; W = Wins; L = Losses; SV = Saves; ERA = Earned run average; SO = Strikeouts

Farm system 

LEAGUE CHAMPIONS: Des Moines

Notes

References

External links 
1953 Chicago Cubs season at Baseball Reference

Chicago Cubs seasons
Chicago Cubs season
Chicago Cubs